Ideal is a daily Spanish language newspaper edited and published in Granada.

It forms part of the  Corporación de Medios de Andalucía, which in turn belongs to the grupo Vocento. Founded in 1932 by Editorial Católica, since then it has had a long history. At present it is the most widely subscription based newspaper in these provinces and one of the main newspapers in Andalusia, reaching in 2010 about 164,000 daily readers according to el Estudio general de medios (EGM).

History 
Ideal had in its origins in the Catholic and conservative daily La Gaceta del Sur, which had disappeared in 1931. The Catholic hierarchy of Granada decided to launch a new newspaper, counting on the collaboration of journalists such as Ángel Herrera Oria y de Pedro Gómez Aparicio. The newspaper went to the streets for the first time on May 8, 1932. It was edited by Editorial Católica. In these early years of existence was a clearly confessional and conservative newspaper, and its main journalistic rival was the liberal El Defensor de Granada. In the context of the 1930s, Ideal was the best manufactured newspaper in the province, surpassing others published in this period. During this era, it highlighted the work of  Ramón Ruiz Alonso, the paper's typographer. During the years of the Second Republic the publication, which reached a circulation of 9000 copies, according to CEDA.

On 10 March 1936 a group of right wing supporters  set fire to the offices of Ideal,  whose printing press was destroyed and the premises reduced to the foundations.  As a consequence, the newspaper did not circulate for some months. In early July, the newspaper returned to Granada, shortly before the outbreak of the Spanish Civil War.

Supplements 
On Sundays, like many other newspapers in the Grupo Vocento, Ideal distributes the supplement XLSemanal. It is a general journal, with reports and collaborations from writers like Arturo Pérez-Reverte and Juan Manuel de Prada.

Directors 
El diario ha sido dirigido desde su fundación por los siguientes periodistas:

Notes

References

Bibliography

External links 

 Historia de Ideal

Publications established in 1932
Grupo Vocento
Mass media in Almería